Donji Milanovac is a town in eastern Serbia. It is situated in the Majdanpek municipality, in the Bor District. It is located on the right bank of Lake Đerdap on the Danube. The population of the town is 2,410 people (2011 census). Its name means "Lower Milanovac" (there is an Upper Milanovac, as well).

The management office of Đerdap national park is located in the town.

It has been nicknamed a "town of 100,000 roses".

Geography 

The town is located on the right bank of Lake Đerdap on the Danube, and is located in the Đerdap national park. The Miroč mountain lies between Donji Milanovac and Tekija and further to the south are the Kučaj mountains. The Miroč is known for the abundance of the medicinal herbs while the area surrounding the town is covered in lush deciduous forests.

It is situated in the Veliki Kazan gorge, a section of the composite Iron Gate gorge. The locality on which the settlement is today used to be called "Trkulja's gallery", after a local artist. A balloon station "Pena" was situated on location, as prior to the discovery of radio, balloons were used for signalization during the navigation through the canal.

The dam prevents belugas from swimming upstream since, so the largest fish in the lake now is wels catfish, with rare specimen reaching .

History 

Donji Milanovac lies on remains of an 8000-year-old Mesolithic settlement of the Lepenski Vir, and of the Roman town of Taliata. Since the founding of the first settlement, Donji Milanovac was moved three times.

It became the first town in Serbia built by architectural planning. The relocation was finished by 1832 and the town became the seat of the Poreč nahiyah.

From 1929 to 1941, Donji Milanovac was part of the Morava Banovina of the Kingdom of Yugoslavia.

Lepenski Vir 

Lepenski Vir is an important Mesolithic archaeological site located 15 kilometers from Donji Milanovac. The latest radiocarbon and AMS data suggests that the chronology of Lepenski Vir is compressed between 9500/7200-6000 BC. There is some disagreement about the early start of the settlement and culture of Lepenskir Vir. But the latest data suggest 9500-7200 to be the start. The late Lepenskir Vir (6300–6000 BC) architectural development was the development of the Trapezoidal buildings and monumental sculpture[1] The Lepenski Vir site consists of one large settlement with around ten satellite villages. Numerous piscine sculptures and peculiar architecture have been found at the site.

Culture 

The Church of St. Nicholas is located in the centre of Donji Milanovac. It was built in 1840 thanks to captain Miša Anastasijević. Captain Miša's konak and Tenka's house have been proclaimed cultural heritage of Serbia. There is a monument to the 1912–1918 wars (Balkan Wars, First World War), and a mammoth sculpture.

Another noted monument is the Roman Tabula Traiana.

Economy 

Until the 1990s, there were numerous companies in the town: wood company "Poreč", factories "FEP" and "Megaplast", hotel "Lepenski Vir", agricultural cooperative "Sloga", etc. By the 2010s, the majority of economy deteriorated and depopulation accelerated.

Tourism 

In 1972 a hotel "Lepenski Vir" was built and the town beach was arranged. The area became a popular camping location as, due to the climate, there are no mosquitos. Donji Milanovac and the gorge are situated on the European bicycle corridor and the Đerdap highway, the shortest connection between Belgrade and Bucharest, Romania, and further with the Black Sea. The town also has a pier, which is today mostly used by the foreign river cruisers. During the 1970s there was a regular motorboat line from Belgrade to Đerdap, which took about two and a half hours.

Donji Milanovac was nicknamed "Serbian Hollywood" as numerous movies were filmed in the town and the surroundings, including Naivko (1975), Ćao, inspektore (1984) and Vampiri su među nama (1989).

Sport 
FK Poreč is the local football club, founded in 1932.

Notable people 

Ilija Zavišić (b. 1952), retired footballer
Aleksandar Jovanović (1896—1977), 
Miša Anastasijević (1803—1885), businessman
Tenka Stefanović (1797—1865), politician
Starina Novak (ca. 1530—1601), guerrilla and military commander
Dragos Ristić (1933-2020), economist

Gallery

References 

Populated places in Bor District
Timok Valley
Populated places on the Danube